Estéban Santa Cruz was a Cuban baseball outfielder in the Cuban League and Negro leagues. He played with several clubs from 1903 to 1910 including Almendares, Club Fé, Matanzas and the Cuban Stars (West). He was also known as Eugenio Santa Cruz.

References

External links

1885 births
Cuban League players
Almendares (baseball) players
Club Fé players
Matanzas players
Cuban Stars (West) players
San Francisco (baseball) players
Year of death unknown
Cuban expatriate baseball players in the United States